Georgia State Route 109 Spur may refer to:

Georgia State Route 109 Spur (Meriwether County), a spur route connecting Greenville to Gay in Meriwether County 
Georgia State Route 109 Spur (Troup County), a former spur route in Troup County that became a part of State Route 109

109 Spur